The 8th U-boat Flotilla (German 8. Unterseebootsflottille) was formed in June 1941 in Königsberg under the command of Kapitänleutnant Georg-Wilhelm Schulz, who also at this time commanded the 6th U-boat Flotilla in Danzig. It was primarily a training flotilla but in the last months of the war some flotilla boats were in combat against the Soviet Navy in the Baltic Sea. The flotilla was disbanded in January 1945.

Commanders

References 

08
Military units and formations of the Kriegsmarine
Military units and formations established in 1941
Military units and formations disestablished in 1945